Laura Madison Blindkilde Brown (born 9 September 2003) is an English professional footballer who plays as a midfielder for Aston Villa in the FA Women's Super League.

Club career
Blindkilde played for the under-21 academy team at Birmingham City before making her senior debut for the club on 11 December 2019 as a stoppage time substitute against Manchester United in a 3–1 League Cup group stage defeat. She made her FA Women's Super League debut the following month, on 5 January 2020 in a 2–0 defeat to Arsenal.

In June 2020, Blindkilde moved to Aston Villa, initially playing with the club's academy team. On 9 September 2021, she signed her first professional contract for Aston Villa. She chose to switch from playing under her surname "Brown" to displaying her Danish middle name "Blindkilde" on the back of her shirt for 2021–22 season.

International career
Blindkilde has represented England at under-17 level.

Career statistics

Club
.

References

External links
 
 
 

2003 births
Living people
Aston Villa W.F.C. players
Women's association football midfielders
English women's footballers
Birmingham City W.F.C. players
England women's youth international footballers